The Ambassador from New Zealand to Brazil is New Zealand's foremost diplomatic representative in the Federative Republic of Brazil, and in charge of New Zealand's diplomatic mission in Brazil.

The embassy is located in Brasília, Brazil's capital city.  New Zealand has maintained a resident ambassador in Brazil since 2001.

List of heads of mission

Ambassadors to Brazil

Non-resident ambassadors, resident in Chile
 David Holborow (1978–1981)
 Ian Landon-Lane (1981–1985)
 Barry Brooks (1985–1988)
 Paul Tipping (1988–1992)
 Frank Wilson (1992–1996)
 David McKee (1996–1998)

Non-resident ambassadors, resident in Argentina
 Caroline Forsyth (1998–2001)

Resident ambassadors
 Denise Almao (2001–2006)
 Alison Mann (2006–2008)
 Mark Trainor  (2008–2011)
 Jeffrey McAlister (2011–2015)
 Caroline Bilkey (2015–2018)
 Chris Langley (2018–)

See also
 Brazil–New Zealand relations

References

 New Zealand Heads of Overseas Missions: Brazil.  New Zealand Ministry of Foreign Affairs and Trade.  Retrieved on 2008-03-29.

Brazil, Ambassadors from New Zealand to
New Zealand